Francisco José Granados Lerena (Valdemoro, 23 January 1964) is a Spanish politician. Involved in the infamous "Púnica" corruption case (actually named after him in a pun) he was held in preventive detention from October 2014 to June 2017. A prominent figure of the People's Party of the Community of Madrid in his capacity as Esperanza Aguirre's lieutenant in the regional branch of the PP, he has served as Mayor of Valdemoro (1999–2003), Minister in the regional government of the Community of Madrid as well as a member of the regional legislature.

Notes

References 

Mayors of places in the Community of Madrid
Members of the 6th Assembly of Madrid
Members of the 7th Assembly of Madrid
Members of the 8th Assembly of Madrid
Members of the 9th Assembly of Madrid
Government ministers of the Community of Madrid
Spanish prisoners and detainees
Members of the People's Parliamentary Group (Assembly of Madrid)
1964 births
Living people
Spanish politicians convicted of crimes